Siti Nafisatul Hariroh (born 14 April 2001) is an Indonesian weightlifter. She won the gold medal in the women's 45kg event at the 2021 Islamic Solidarity Games held in Konya, Turkey.

She competed in the women's 49kg event at the Junior World Weightlifting Championships held in Tashkent, Uzbekistan. She also competed in the women's 49kg event at the 2021 World Weightlifting Championships held in Tashkent, Uzbekistan. She won the bronze medal in the women's 45kg event at the 2021 Southeast Asian Games held in Hanoi, Vietnam.

She won the silver medal in the women's 45kg event at the 2022 Asian Weightlifting Championships held in Manama, Bahrain.

Achievements

References

External links 
 

Living people
2001 births
Place of birth missing (living people)
Indonesian female weightlifters
Islamic Solidarity Games medalists in weightlifting
Islamic Solidarity Games competitors for Indonesia
Southeast Asian Games medalists in weightlifting
Southeast Asian Games bronze medalists for Indonesia
Competitors at the 2021 Southeast Asian Games
21st-century Indonesian women